Clifford the Big Red Dog is a series of children's books written by Norman Bridwell.

Clifford the Big Red Dog may also refer to:

Clifford (character), the central character of Clifford the Big Red Dog

Film
Clifford's Really Big Movie, 2004 animated movie
Clifford the Big Red Dog (film), 2021 live-action/CGI movie

TV
Clifford the Big Red Dog (2000 TV series), 2000 animated TV series
Clifford's Puppy Days, 2003 animated TV series
Clifford the Big Red Dog (2019 TV series), 2019 animated TV series

See also
Clifford (disambiguation)